"The Wife's Story" is a short story written by Ursula K. Le Guin.

Plot summary
Written in a vernacular first-person narrative, the title character (who is eventually revealed to be a wolf) describes her beloved spouse and their idyllic family life in the past tense, except during the new moon, when he mysteriously disappeared. She then relates the night she witnessed his metamorphosis into a human and screamed in horror, resulting in her family and neighbors chasing and killing him.

Interpretation
The story is unusual for its point-of-view: Of the many books and stories on werewolves, few are written from the perspective of wolves. Le Guin goes to great lengths to conceal the nature of the narrator, fully exploiting the reader's assumptions to purposefully heighten the plot twist at the story's denouement.

References
Notes

Bibliography

External links
"Changing Lives Through Literature" entry about the story

Short stories by Ursula K. Le Guin
1982 short stories
Werewolf written fiction